Norman Holcombe is a former American slalom canoeist who competed from the late 1960s to the mid-1970s. He won a silver medal in the mixed C-2 event at the 1973 ICF Canoe Slalom World Championships in Muotathal.

References

American male canoeists
Living people
Year of birth missing (living people)
Medalists at the ICF Canoe Slalom World Championships